Kalateh-ye Teymur (also Romanized as Kalāteh-ye Teymūr) is a village in Barrud Rural District, Kuhsorkh District, Kuhsorkh County, Razavi Khorasan Province, Iran. At the 2006 census, its population was 153, in 38 families.

References 

Populated places in Kuhsorkh County